Amityville 4: The Evil Escapes (also known on screen as Amityville Horror: The Evil Escapes) is a 1989 American made-for-television supernatural horror film written and directed by Sandor Stern, and starring Patty Duke, Jane Wyatt and Fredric Lehne. The fourth film based on The Amityville Horror, it premiered on NBC on May 12, 1989. This was the only Amityville sequel to be based on a book in the main book series. Amityville: The Horror Returns was to air on NBC but the film was never made. It is never explained in the movie how the house is whole again, considering it exploded at the end of the third movie.

Plot
On a rainy night, six priests, led by Father Manfred, enter the infamous Amityville Horror house and start to exorcise it. One of the priests, Father Dennis Kibbler, is in an upstairs bedroom and begins to bless it when he sees a glowing brass floor lamp. As he begins to chant, a burst of energy emerges from the outlet, through the cord, and into the lamp. A demonic face appears in the large round bulb. Kibbler is knocked across the room and is unconscious.

A few days later, the real estate agency decides to have a yard sale by selling the previous owners' items left in the house. Father Manfred believes that the evil spirits are finally gone from the house. Meanwhile, at the yard sale, a woman named Helen Royce and her friend Rhona are looking through the items when Helen finds the lamp. At only $100.00, Helen decides to buy the lamp as a birthday present for her sister, explaining that she and her sister send each other rather ugly gifts as a long-running joke. While checking the lamp, Helen cuts her finger on a brass collar around the bulb. Ignoring the cut on her finger, Helen buys the lamp. Helen's finger begins to get infected and discolored as the day goes on. Helen later dies of Tetanus.

One week later, the lamp arrives at Helen's sister, Alice Leacock's house, a large, three-story home over a beach in a small town called Dancott, California. That day, Alice's daughter, Nancy Evans, and her three children, Amanda, Brian, and the youngest child, quiet, mysterious Jessica, move in with Alice. Once they arrive, Alice decides to open the package containing the lamp. Nancy thinks the lamp is hideous, while Alice finds it interesting. Once the lamp is turned on, Alice's parrot, Fred, begins to act crazy, and her cat, Pepper, scratches Amanda. While the rest of the family pays little to no attention to the lamp, Jessica seems to be drawn toward it.

The lamp then begins to manipulate electrical devices around the house or perform seemingly impossible feats, such as killing the parrot and putting it in the toaster oven, turning on the kitchen sink's garbage disposal, and cutting off the hand of the electrician's apprentice, and vandalizing Jessica's room.

When Nancy calls a plumber to fix the pipes, the lamp murders him by drowning him in sewage and then makes his van leave on its own, making it seem like he left. Jessica is drawn to the lamp and starts to believe her dead father's spirit is inside it. Meanwhile, Father Kibbler, while staying at Father Manfred's place, gets a call from the lamp, which makes smoke come out of the phone and melts the speaker. Worried, he travels to Dancott to investigate. When most of the family is away, Jessica is entranced by the lamp, which then uses its extension cord to murder their housekeeper Peggy.

The police investigate though they do not find the plumber's body. Father Kibbler contacts Nancy and tries to convince her that the evil has taken possession of an object from the Amityville house. They rush home only to find that the lamp used a window to knock out Amanda and has brainwashed Jessica, who stabs Father Kibbler in the shoulder while the lamp's extension cord tries to stop him from exorcising it. Alice saves the day by grabbing the lamp and throwing it out of the window, shattering it on the rocky shoreline below. The movie ends with the family thinking their ordeal is over, not realizing that the dead plumber is still inside their house. The camera pans to the remains of the lamp, showing the evil within has now possessed the family's cat.

Cast
 Patty Duke as Nancy Evans
 Jane Wyatt as Alice Leacock
 Fredric Lehne as Father Kibbler
 Lou Hancock as Peggy
 Brandy Gold as Jessica Evans
 Zoe Trilling as Amanda Evans (as Geri Betzler)
 Aron Eisenberg as Brian Evans
 Norman Lloyd as Father Manfred
 Robert Alan Browne as Donald McTear
 Gloria Cromwell as Rhona
 James Stern as Danny Read
 Peggy McCay as Helen Royce
 Warren Munson as Doctor

Continuity
Despite the destruction of the house in the conclusion of the previous film it manages to make an appearance in this film. The films after 3-D usually do not pick up where the previous film left off, so no explanation has ever been given as to how the house is still standing. It is possible this film may take place before Amityville 3-D due to the house already being empty in that film and after the yard sale in this one, which was later explained in Amityville: It's About Time. The furniture that was left in the house in the beginning of the film is believed to be owned by the Lutz family in the first movie. The film also makes a reference to Amityville II: The Possession.

Release
Amityville 4: The Evil Escapes was distributed on home video by Medusa in the United Kingdom in April 1990. It was released on DVD twice by Allumination Filmworks in 2003 and 2007. In 2019, Vinegar Syndrome released the film on Blu-ray in the US which was included in the boxset ‘Amityville: The Cursed Collection’. In 2022, the film was released on Blu-ray in the UK courtesy of Screenbound Pictures Ltd.

Reception

On The A.V. Club web site, Amityville 4 is one movie listed in the article "Night of the Killer Lamp: 23 Ridiculous Horror-Movie Adversaries". The article states the film's efforts to make a possessed lamp seem scary "border on camp".

Filming locations

The replica of the original Amityville house was located at 402 East M St., Wilmington, California. A facade was added to the side of the house to give it the Amityville appearance. The interiors of this house were filmed also.

The exteriors for Alice Leacock's house were filmed at the James Sharp House, 11840 W. Telegraph Rd, Santa Paula, California. The house is an historical Italian Villa style home built in 1890. In reality, it does not back out onto an oceanside cliff as depicted in the movie. Instead, it backs out onto the Santa Paula Freeway, about a quarter of a mile behind the house. For a second, you can see the tower of the house in the distance while driving on the Freeway.

The interiors of the grandmother's house were filmed at the Woodbury-Story House in Altadena, California.

Hospital scenes were filmed at the California Hospital Medical Center in Los Angeles.

An exterior shot of the John Marshall High School in Los Angeles, California was also used.

References

External links
 
 
 And You Call Yourself A Scientist - Amityville 4 extensive plot summary and review

1989 crime drama films
1989 films
1989 horror films
1989 independent films
1989 television films
1980s horror drama films
1980s psychological drama films
1980s psychological horror films
1980s supernatural horror films
American haunted house films
American horror drama films
American horror television films
American independent films
American psychological drama films
American psychological horror films
American sequel films
American supernatural drama films
American supernatural horror films
Amityville Horror films
Demons in film
American drama television films
Films about Catholic priests
Films about animal cruelty
Films about dysfunctional families
Films about exorcism
Films about grieving
Films about murder
Films about single parent families
Films about widowhood
Films based on American horror novels
Films directed by Sandor Stern
Films set in California
Films set in hospitals
Films set in Long Island
Films set in religious buildings and structures
Films about shapeshifting
Films about spirit possession
Films shot in California
Films shot in Los Angeles
Maids in films
NBC network original films
Religious drama films
Religious horror films
Sentient objects in fiction
Television films based on books
Television sequel films
Television prequel films
1980s English-language films
1980s American films
American prequel films